Charles Hamlin (September 13, 1837 – May 15, 1911), from Bangor, Maine, was an attorney and a Union Army officer during the American Civil War, attaining the rank of major. He was nominated for appointment to the grade of brevet brigadier general of volunteers by President Andrew Johnson on January 13, 1866, to rank from March 13, 1865, and the United States Senate confirmed the appointment on March 12, 1866.  He was one of the sons of Vice President Hannibal Hamlin and a brother to Cyrus Hamlin, a Union Army brigadier general.

Biography

Hamlin was born in Hampden, Maine, and graduated from Bowdoin College in 1857. During the American Civil War, Hamlin served in the Union Army as a major, and was awarded the honorary rank of brevet brigadier general United States Volunteers, to rank from March 13, 1865, by U.S. Senate confirmation on March 12, 1866.

Hamlin began his military career as a major in the 1st Maine Heavy Artillery Regiment. He gained a staff position as major and assistant adjutant general in the Army of the Potomac.  He fought in the Battle of Gettysburg among other engagements. Hamlin served as assistant adjutant general on the staffs of Generals Hiram G. Berry and Albion P. Howe. While serving under Gen. Howe in Washington, Hamlin was in the audience at Ford's Theatre when President Lincoln was assassinated. Hamlin was mustered out of the U.S. Volunteers on September 14, 1865. On January 13, 1866, Hamlin was nominated by President Andrew Johnson for the award of the honorary grade of brevet brigadier general United States Volunteers, to rank from March 13, 1865 for faithful and meritorious services The U.S. Senate confirmed the award on March 12, 1866.

Along with his sister Sarah, Hamlin was at Ford's Theater on the night of the Lincoln assassination.

After the war, Hamlin became a companion of the Military Order of the Loyal Legion of the United States.

A lawyer in civilian life, Hamlin returned to his home in Bangor, Maine after the war.  He became the City Solicitor of Bangor in 1867.  In 1883 and 1885 he was elected to successive terms in the Maine House of Representatives, becoming its Speaker in his second term.  He also served as president of the Eastern Maine General Hospital (now the Eastern Maine Medical Center).

See also

List of American Civil War brevet generals (Union)

Notes

References
 Eicher, John H., and Eicher, David J., Civil War High Commands. Stanford: Stanford University Press, 2001. .
 Guide to the Hamlin Family Papers, Folger Library, University of Maine Orono.
 Hunt, Roger D. and Brown, Jack R. Brevet Brigadier Generals in Blue. Gaithersburg, MD: Olde Soldier Books, Inc., 1990. .

External links

1837 births
1911 deaths
Children of vice presidents of the United States
People from Hampden, Maine
Politicians from Bangor, Maine
Speakers of the Maine House of Representatives
Union Army officers
People of Maine in the American Civil War
Republican Party members of the Maine House of Representatives
19th-century American politicians